Bezděkov may refer to places in the Czech Republic:

Bezděkov (Havlíčkův Brod District), a municipality and village in the Vysočina Region
Bezděkov (Klatovy District), a municipality and village in the Plzeň Region
Bezděkov (Pardubice District), a municipality and village in the Pardubice Region
Bezděkov (Rokycany District), a municipality and village in the Plzeň Region
Bezděkov nad Metují, a municipality and village in the Hradec Králové Region
Bezděkov pod Třemšínem, a municipality and village in the Central Bohemian Region
Dolní Bezděkov, a municipality and village in the Pardubice Region
Horní Bezděkov, a municipality and village in the Central Bohemian Region